Emilio Volpicelli (born 3 August 1992) is an Italian footballer who plays as a forward for  club Sangiuliano.

Club career
He made his Serie C debut for Fidelis Andria on 29 August 2016 in a game against Foggia.

He was the top-scorer of Group H of 2017–18 Serie D.

On 13 July 2019, he joined Sambenedettese on loan.

On 27 August 2020 he was sold to Matelica.

On 7 June 2021, he moved to Viterbese.

On 31 January 2023, Volpicelli signed a 1.5-year contract with Sangiuliano.

References

External links
 

1992 births
Living people
Footballers from Naples
Italian footballers
Association football forwards
Serie C players
Serie D players
Fermana F.C. players
A.S.D. Gallipoli Football 1909 players
S.S. Fidelis Andria 1928 players
A.S. Bisceglie Calcio 1913 players
Venezia F.C. players
F.C. Francavilla players
U.S. Salernitana 1919 players
A.S. Pro Piacenza 1919 players
A.S. Sambenedettese players
S.S. Matelica Calcio 1921 players
U.S. Viterbese 1908 players
F.C. Sangiuliano City players